, known as Gridman the Hyper Agent in some English-speaking territories, is a 1993–1994 Japanese tokusatsu "Giant Hero" series created by Tsuburaya Productions (the producers of Ultraman) and would be Tsuburaya's last non-Ultra superhero production before Bio Planet WoO. It was the inspiration and source material for DiC Entertainment's Superhuman Samurai Syber-Squad.

Shot on live video, Gridman was the first series by Tsuburaya Productions to utilize D-2 digital video for its special effects scenes, allowing for smoother slow-motion photography. Tsuburaya, having switched to digital techniques since then, would continue to use D-2 for all future productions.

The series was released in the United States with subtitles in English on the television network TOKU on December 18, 2017. The series was also made available on Toku's streaming service and on its Amazon Prime channel.

On October 30, 2020, the series began streaming episodes weekly on Tsuburaya's Ultraman Official YouTube channel to mark the second anniversary of SSSS.Gridman. Episodes are released each Friday at 6:30pm JST and have English subtitles available. Two weeks after the premiere date of each episode, the episode is removed from the channel. Mill Creek Entertainment released the complete series on Blu-ray for the first time in North America on August 17, 2021.

Story

Three computer-savvy kids, Naoto, Yuka and Ippei create their own videogame super-hero, but then discover it's possessed by an inter-dimensional police officer Gridman. Pursuing an evil program called Khan Digifer, he merges with Naoto and fights Khan Digifer's digitized monsters (created by social misfit Takeshi) in order to prevent the computerized demon from wreaking havoc on the town of Sakuragaoka and the entire Human World.

Episodes

Cast
: 
: 
: 
: 
: 
: 
: 
: 
: 
:  (Played as )
: 
:  (Played as "新井 昌和")
: 
: 
: 
: 
: 
: 
:

Other media

Superhuman Samurai Syber-Squad

Airing from September 1994 to April 1995 in syndication, Superhuman Samurai Syber-Squad was an American adaption of Gridman produced by Tsuburaya, Ultracom (Tsuburaya's American division), and DiC Entertainment. It starred Matthew Lawrence as Sam Collins/Servo, Glen Beaudin as Malcolm Frink, Troy Slaten as Amp Ere, Kevin Castro as Tanker, Robin Mary Florence as Sydney Forrester, Jayme Betcher as Jennifer Doyle, John Wesley as Principal Pratchert, Diana Bellamy as Rimba Starkey, Kelli Kirkland as Yolanda Pratchert, and Tim Curry as the voice of Kilokahn. The story revolves around a rock band named Team Samurai, led by Collins, that fights evil Mega Virus monsters created by Malcolm Frink and brought to life by Kilokahn in the Digital World. Due to direct involvement from Tsuburaya, unlike most adaptions of Tokusatsu programs from that time period, Superhuman Samurai Syber-Squad remained largely faithful to its source material and retained elements from Gridman including sound effects, character traits and arcs, plot points, and certain names.

Denkou Choujin Gridman: boys invent great hero
In 2015, the series inspired an animated short directed by Akira Amemiya and produced by Studio Trigger for the Japan Animator Expo. Entitled, it debuted on January 16, 2015.

The entire short took place in 22 years after Gridman's final battle with Khan Digifer. Takeshi Todo, a former brainwashed servant of Khan, reflects on the past incidents as monster attacks took place in real life. Using the Acceptor, he transforms into Gridman Sigma before facing the monster.

Gridman Universe

During Anime Expo 2017, Akira Amemiya, Studio Trigger and Tsuburaya announced SSSS.GRIDMAN, a brand new original anime series incorporating elements from both the original Gridman and its western adaptation, which aired in 2018. It is followed by a 2021 sequel called SSSS.Dynazenon with a crossover film, Gridman Universe, announced.

Songs
Opening theme

Lyrics: Akira Ōtsu
Composition: Kisaburo Suzuki
Arrangement: Masaki Iwamoto
Artist: Norio Sakai
The piano version of "Yume no Hero" made its appearance in the sixth episode of SSSS.Gridman.

Ending theme

Lyrics: Akira Ōtsu
Composition: Kisaburo Suzuki
Arrangement: Masaki Iwamoto
Artist: Norio Sakai

Insert song

Lyrics: Atsushi Aida
Composition & Arrangement: Osamu Totsuka
Artist: Compoid Three
The karaoke version of "Futatsu no Yūki" made its appearance in the fourth episode of SSSS.Gridman.

References

External links
Official website

1993 Japanese television series debuts
1994 Japanese television series endings
Tsuburaya Productions
Tokusatsu television series
Ultra television series
TBS Television (Japan) original programming
Cyberpunk television series
Television shows about virtual reality
Japanese action television series
Japanese fantasy television series
Japanese science fiction television series